The Recueil des historiens des croisades (trans: Collection of the Historians of the Crusades) is a major collection of several thousand medieval documents written during the Crusades.  The documents were collected and published in Paris in the 19th century, and include documents in Latin, Greek, Arabic, Old French, and Armenian. The documents cover the entire period of the Crusades, and are frequently cited in scholarly works, as a way of locating a specific document. When being quoted in citations, the collection is often abbreviated as RHC or R.H.C..

Images of the documents can be viewed in some major libraries. The 1967 reprint of the entire collection by Gregg Press can also be found in major libraries, and there are also full-text PDF files available online, which have been made available by the Bibliothèque Nationale de France Gallica project.  Documents can be downloaded in their entirety, or stepped through page by page, with both the original text, and a French translation.

Presentation 
According to the introductory Report to the first volume of the Western Historians, this collection brings up to date the previous collection published in 1611 by Jacques Bongars under the title Gesta Dei per Francos, due to "the discovery of many literary and historical monuments which Bongars could not have suspected the existence", including those published in the collections of Duchesne, Archery, Mabillon, Martène and many other foreign compilers.

The editors of this collection have chosen to consider 1291 as the end date of the Crusades, since the fall of Saint-Jean-d'Acre completed the ruin of Christian institutions in Palestine. So historians posterior to the middle of the fourteenth century are not included. Were also excluded works more literary than historical, like novels on the Crusades, and also the narration related to the conquest of Constantinople by the French and the Venetians, because they did take almost no part in the events of Palestine. Neither was included Joinville's Histoire, because the commission of the Académie des inscriptions et belles-lettres did class this author among France's general historians.

Contents
The RHC is divided into five series:
Lois ("RHC Lois"; the Assizes of Jerusalem)
Historiens occidentaux ("RHC Oc" or "RHC Occ"; Western European texts in Latin and Old French)
Historiens orientaux ("RHC Or"; Arabic texts)
Historiens grecs ("RHC Grec"; Greek texts)
Historiens arméniens ("RHC Arm"; Armenian texts)

Lois (1841–1843) 
Full title: Assises de Jérusalem ou Recueil des ouvrages de jurisprudence composés pendant le XIIIe siècle dans les royaumes de Jérusalem et de Chypre, par M. Le Comte Beugnot

Volume 1 
Introduction to the Assizes of the Haute Cour (by Beugnot)
 I. 	Livre de Jean d'Ibelin
 II. 	Livre de Geoffroy le Tort
 III. 	Livre de Jacques d'Ibelin
 IV. 	Livre de Philippe de Navarre
 V. 	La Clef des Assises de la Haute Cour du royaume de Jérusalem et de Chypre
 VI. 	Le Livre au Roi

Table des matières

Volume 2 
Introduction to the Assizes of the Cour des Bourgeois (by Beugnot)
I. 	Livre des Assises de la Cour des Bourgeois
II. 	Abrégé du Livre des Assises de la Cour des Bourgeois
III. 	Bans et Ordonnances des rois de Chypre
IV. 	Formules
 
Appendix

I. 	Documents relatifs à la successibilité au trône et à la régence
II. 	Document relatif au service militaire
III. 	Les Lignages d'Outremer
IV. 	Charters

Glossary
 
Table of contents.

Historiens occidentaux (1844–1895)

Volume 1 (1844) 
 First part
 Report on the publication of the Recueil des historiens des croisades
 Preface
 Notice on the general map of the theatre of the crusades
 William of Tyre's Chronique, Historia rerum in partibus transmarinis gestarum, in Latin, up to book 23
 Second part (p. 703)
 William of Tyre's Chronique, Historia rerum in partibus transmarinis gestarum, in Latin, Rest
 Ernoul's Chronique, L’estoire de Eracles empereur, translation in old french of the former
 Variantes Lectiones
 Index Generalis

Volume 2 (1859) 
 Preface
 Description of the manuscripts
 Table of contents of the second volume
 Corrections and additions
 L'estoire de eracles émpereur (continuation; in Old French) Book 23 to 34
 Continuation of William of Tyre from the so-called "Rothelin manuscript"
 Chronological analysis of William of Tyre and his continuators
 Glossary
 Table

Volume 3 (1866) 
Preface

 I. 	Petri Tudebodi seu Tudebovis, sacerdotis Sivracensis, historia de Hierosolymitano itinere
 II.	Gesta Francorum et aliorum Hierosolymitanorum, seu Tudebodus abbreviatus (Expeditio contra Turcos)
 III.	Tudebodus imitatus et continuatus, ex codice bibliothecae casinensis qui inscribitur, Historia peregrinorum euntium Jerusolymam ad liberandum Sanctum Sepulcrum de potestate ethnicorum, et a cl. Viro Mabillone editus est in Musaeo italico
 IV.	Raimundi de Aguilers, canonici Podiensis, historia Francorum qui ceperunt Iherusalem
 V.	Historia Iherosolymitana. Gesta Francorum Iherusalem peregrinantium, ab anno Domini MXCV usque ad annum MCXXVII, auctore domno Fulcherio Carnotensi
 VI.	Gesta Francorum expugnantium Iherusalem
 VII.	Secunda pars historiae Iherosolimitanae
 VIII.	Gesta Tancredi in expeditione Hierosolymitana, auctore Rudolfo Cadomensi, ejus familiari
 IX.	Roberti Monachi historia Iherosolimitana
 X.	Stephani, comitis Carnotensis, atque Anselmi de Ribodi Monte epistolae
 Index generalis quo nomina quae ad res, locos et homines pertinent, comprehenduntur

Volume 4 (1879) 
Preface

 I.	Baldrici, episcopi Dolensis, Historia Jerosolimitana
 II.	Historia quae dicitur Gesta Dei per Francos, edita a venerabili Domno Guiberto, abbate monasterii Sanctae Mariae Novigenti
 III.	Alberti Aquensis Historia Hierosolymitana
 Index generalis quo nomina quae ad res locos, homines, pertinent, comprehenduntur

Volume 5 (1895) 
 Preface

 I. Ekkehardi abbatis Uraugiensis Hierosolymita
 II. Cafari de Caschifelone, Genuensis, De libertatione civitatum Orientis
 III. Galterii, cancellarii Antiocheni, Bella Antiochena, 1114–1119
 IV. Balduini III Historia Nicaena vel Antiochena
 V. Theodori Palidensis Narratio profectionis Godefridi ducis ad Jerusalem
 VI. Passiones beati Thiemonis
 VII. Documenta Lipsanographica ad I. bellum sacrum spectantia
 VIII. Primi belli sacri Narrationes minores
 IX. Exordium Hospitalariorum
 X. Historia Gotfridi
 XI. Benedicti de Accoltis, Aretini, Historia Gotefridi
 XII. Li Estoire de Jerusalem et d’Antioche
 XIII.	Itinerario di la gran militia, a la pavese
 XIV. Fulco. Gilo
 Index generalis

Historiens orientaux (1872–1906)

Volume 1 (1872) 
 Introduction
 Summary of the history of the Crusades, taken from the Concise History of Humanity of Abu'l-Feda (Arabic/French)
 Autobiography of Abu'l-Feda, extract from his chronicle
 Extract from The Complete History by ibn Athir (Arabic/French)
 Appendix
 Notes and corrections

Volume 2, part 1 (1887) 
	Advertisement

	Extract from The Complete History by ibn Athir (continuation) (Arabic/French)
	Extracts from The Necklace of Pearls by Badr al-Din al-Ayni (Arabic/French)
	List of chapters from the extract of The Complete History by ibn Athir
	Index

Volume 2, part 2 (1876) 
 History of the Atabegs of Mosul by ibn Athir (Arabic/French)
 List of chapters
 Index

Volume 3 (1884) 
 Anecdotes and good habits of the life of the Sultan Youssof (Saladin) of Abu’l-Mahāsin (Arabic/French)
 Notice on Beha Ed-Din Abou’L-Mehacen Ibn Cheddad, Extract from the Dictionary of Ibn Khallican (Arabic/French)
 Extracts from the Autobiography of Abd al-Latif (Arabic/French)
 Voyage by ibn Jubayr (Arabic/French)
 Extracts from ibn Muyessar (Arabic/French)
 Extracts from the Nodjoum az-Zahireh of Abu’l-Mahāsin (Arabic/French)
 Extracts from the Mirat az-Zeman of Sibt ibn al-Jawzi (Arabic/French)
 Extracts from the Chronicle of Aleppo by Kamal ad-Din (Arabic/French)
 Extracts from the biographical dictionary of Kamal ad-Din (Arabic/French)

Volume 4 (1898) 
 The Book of the Two Gardens, History of the Two Kingdoms, that of Nur ad-Din and that of Saladin (13 June 1146 – 29 January 1191), by Abu Shama (Arabic/French)
 Tables des Matières
 Publications

Volume 5 (1906) 
 The Book of the Two Gardens, History of the Two Kingdoms, that of Nur ad-Din and that of Saladin (continuation)
 Index

Historiens grecs (1875–1881)

Volume 1 (1875) 
 Preface
 Variantes lectiones e codice Florentino
 I. Scriptores Graeci Bellorum a Francis dei signa sequentibus in Syria susceptorum (Michael Attaliata, Psellus), Annotationes Historiae et philologicae ad partem primam
 II. Scriptores Graeci Bellorum a Francis dei signa sequentibus in Syria Susceptorum. Pars secunda (Anna Comnena)
 III. Scriptores Graeci Bellorum a Francis dei signa sequentibus in Syria Susceptorum. Pars tertia. Transitio. (Cinnamus, Nicetas)
 IV. Scriptores Graeci Bellorum a Francis dei signa sequentibus in Syria Susceptorum. Pars quarta (Nicetas)
 V. Scriptores Graeci Bellorum a Francis dei signa sequentibus in Syria Susceptorum. Pars quinta. (Nicephorus Gregoras, Ioannes Phocas, Neophytus, Georgius Agropolita De Syria Expugnata. (Ephraemius)
 Addenda et corrigenda

Volume 2 (1881) 
 Preface
 Scriptores Graeci Bellorum a Francis dei signa sequentibus in Syria Susceptorum. Adnotationes Historicae et philologicae ad partem secundum.
 Scriptores Graeci Bellorum a Francis dei signa sequentibus in Syria Susceptorum. Adnotationes Historicae et philologicae ad partem tertiam.
 Scriptores Graeci Bellorum a Francis dei signa sequentibus in Syria Susceptorum. Adnotationes Historicae et philologicae ad partem
 Scriptores Graeci Bellorum a Francis dei signa sequentibus in Syria Susceptorum. Adnotationes Historicae et philologicae ad partem quintam.
 Scriptores Graeci Bellorum a Francis dei signa sequentibus in Syria Susceptorum. Appendix (Theodore Prodromos)
 Index Graecitatis
 Addenda et corrigenda

Documents arméniens (1869–1906)

Volume 1 (1869) 
 Preface
 Introduction
 Chap. I.	Physical geography, considered together with political geography
 Chap. II.	The Kingdom of Lesser Armenia from the historical point of view
 Chap. III.	Commerce, customs tariffs, and civil condition of foreigners in Lesser Armenia
 Genealogical and dynastic tables
 Chronicle of Matthew of Edessa
 Chronique de Grégoire le Prètre of Gregory the Priest
 Oraison Funèbre de Baudouin by Basil the Doctor
 Elégie sur la Prise d’Edessa by Catholicos Nerses Shnorhali
 Elégie sur la Prise de Jérusalem by Catholicos Gregory Dgh'a, successor to Nerses
 Chronicle of Michael the Syrian
 Guiragos of Kantzag
 Vartan the Great
 Samuel of Ani
 Hethoum the historian, count of Gorigos
 Bahram of Edessa
 Popular song on the captivity of Leo
 Hetoum II of Armenia
 Saint Nerses of Lambron	
 Sempad the Constable
 Mardiros (Martyr) of Crimea
 Doctor Mekhithar of Dashir
 Appendis
 Armenian charters
 Index

Volume 2 (1906) 
 Preface

 I. Chronicle of Armenia (Jean Dardel)
 II. La Flor des Estoires des parties d’Orient. Livre I.-IV. (Hayton)
 III. Directorium ad passagium faciendum. (Brocardus)
 IV. De modo saracenos extirpandi (Guillaume Adam)
 V. Responsio ad errores impositos Hermenis (Daniel de Thaurisio)
 VI. Les gestes des Chiprois. Livre I.-III.
 Index
 Additions and corrections

References

External links
 RHC Lois I (1841)  (also at Internet Archive)
 RHC Lois II (1843)  (also at Internet Archive)
 RHC Occ vol. 1 (1844)(also at Internet Archive); second part (also at Internet Archive)
 RHC Occ vol. 2 (1859) (also at Internet Archive)
 RHC Occ vol. 3 (1866) (also at Internet Archive)
 RHC Occ vol. 4 (1879) (also at Internet Archive)
 RHC Occ vol. 5 (1895) (also at Internet Archive)
 RHC Or vol. 1 (1872)  (also at Internet Archive)
 RHC Or vol. 2.1 (1887) (also at Internet Archive)
 RHC Or vol. 2.2 (1876)   (also at Internet Archive)
 RHC Or vol. 3 (1884)  (also at Internet Archive )
 RHC Or vol. 4 (1898)   (also at Internet Archive )
 RHC Or vol. 5 (1906)   (also at Internet Archive )
 RHC Arm vol. 1 (1869) (also at Internet Archive)
 RHC Arm vol. 2 (1906) (also at Internet Archive)
 RHC Grec vol. 1 (1875) (also at Internet Archive)
 RHC Grec vol. 2 (1881) (also at Internet Archive)

+